The Magdalen Islands are a small archipelago in the Gulf of Saint Lawrence with a land area of . While part of the Province of Quebec, the islands are in fact closer to the Maritime provinces and Newfoundland than to the Gaspé Peninsula on the Quebec mainland. The islands constitute a part of the Epegwitg aq Pigtug district of Mi'kma'ki—the country of the Mi'kmaw Nation—who call the islands Menagoesenog.

Administratively, the islands are part of the Gaspésie–Îles-de-la-Madeleine region in the Canadian province of Quebec. The islands form the territory equivalent to a regional county municipality (TE) and the census division (CD) of Les Îles-de-la-Madeleine. Their geographical code is 01.

The islands are also coextensive with the urban agglomeration of Les Îles-de-la-Madeleine, which is divided into two municipalities: Les Îles-de-la-Madeleine (2011 census pop. 12,291), the central municipality, and Grosse-Île (pop. 490). Their mayors are Gaétan Richard and Rose Elmonde Clarke, respectively.

Geography 

Within Dawnland, these islands were once called Menquit by the Mi'kmaw Nation, meaning "islands battered by waves." Around the mid 19th century as Mi'kmawi'simk (the Mi'kmaw language) shifted, the name changed to become Menagoesenog reflecting islands "battered by the surf." Although not a distinct district within Mi'kma'ki, the archipelago falls within the territorial bounds of the Mi'kmaw homeland.

There are eight major islands: Amherst, Grande Entrée, Grindstone, Grosse-Île, House Harbour, Pointe-Aux-Loups, Entry Island, and Brion,
all except Brion being inhabited.  There are several other tiny islands that are also considered to be part of the archipelago: Bird Rock (Rocher aux Oiseaux), Seal Island (Île aux Loups-marins), Île Paquet, and Rocher du Corps Mort.

The interiors of the islands were once completely covered with pine forests. An ancient salt dome underlies the archipelago. The salt's inherent buoyancy forces the uplift of the overlying Permian red sandstone.

Nearby salt domes are believed to be sources of fossil fuels. Rock salt is mined on the Islands.

History 

In 1534, the explorer Jacques Cartier was the first known European to visit the islands. However, Mi'kmaqs had been visiting the islands for hundreds of years, as part of a seasonal subsistence migration, probably to harvest the abundant walrus population. A number of archaeological sites have been excavated on the archipelago.

The first concerted settlement attempt was made by English Puritan Separatist Francis Johnson in 1597, which failed.

The archipelago was named in 1663 by François Doublet (1619 or 1620 - approx. 1678), the seigneur of the island, after his wife, Madeleine Fontaine.

In 1765, the islands were inhabited by 22 French-speaking Acadians and their families. They were working and hunting walruses for a British trader, Richard Gridley. Many inhabitants of the Magdalen Islands (Madelinots) still fly the Acadian flag and identify as both Acadian and Québécois.

The islands were administered as part of the British Colony of Newfoundland from 1763 to 1774, when they became part of Quebec 

Some of the islanders are descendants of survivors of the more than 400 shipwrecks on the islands. Some of the historic houses were built from wood that was from the shipwrecks.

The islands have some of Quebec's oldest English-speaking settlements. Although most anglophones have long either assimilated with the francophone population or migrated elsewhere, English-speaking settlements are found at Old Harry, Grosse-Ile, and Entry Island.

The islands are known for a children's French camp. Activities include sand castle competitions and a night alone in the woods.

To improve the safety of ships, the government constructed lighthouses on the islands. They indicate navigable channels and have reduced the number of shipwrecks, but many old hulks are found on the beaches and under the waters.

Until the 20th century, the islands were completely isolated during the winter since the pack ice made the trip to the mainland impassable by boat. The islands had no means of communication with the mainland. An underwater cable was installed to enable communication by telegraph, but in winter 1910, the cable broke, and the islands were again isolated. Residents sent an urgent request for help to the mainland by writing letters and sealing them inside a molasses barrel, or puncheon, which they set adrift. It reached the shore on Cape Breton Island, where residents notified the government of the emergency. The government sent an icebreaker to bring aid.

Within a few years, the government constructed new wireless telegraph stations on the Magdalens to ensure winter communication. The puncheon became famous as a symbol of survival, and every tourist shop sells replicas.

At one time, large walrus herds were found near the islands, but over-hunting had eliminated them by the late 18th century.

In the 21st century, the islands' beaches provide a habitat for the endangered piping plover and the roseate tern.

Demographics

Population

Language

Climate
The maritime climate of the Magdalen Islands is markedly different from that of the mainland. The huge water masses that circle the archipelago both temper the weather and create milder conditions in each season. On the islands, winter is mild, spring is cool, summer has a few heat waves, and fall is typically warm. The Magdalen Islands have the least annual frost in Quebec. The warm breezes of summer persist well into September and sometimes early October. However, under the Köppen climate classification its climate is humid continental (Dfb) because its winters average far below freezing by maritime standards. Seasonal lag is strong because of the freezing water and the time that it takes for the gulf to warm up again. Also, in winter, sea ice occasionally forms, impeding offshore communications and activities.

The Magdalen Islands have warmed 2.3 °C (4 °F) in the late 19th century, twice the global average. As a result, the residents are facing a growing number of problems, as extreme climate change transforms the land and water around them. The sea ice that used to encase and protect the islands from most winter storms is shrinking at a rate of about  annually. Important roads are at risk of washouts, and important infrastructure, including the hospital and city hall sit near deteriorating cliffs.

Erosion 
Several news articles in 2019 pointed out that erosion of the coastline had already become a significant issue. Researchers have found that the amount has doubled since 2005, and was averaging half a meter (20") per year. Recent events that added to the problem included a significant windstorm in November 2018 and the post-tropical storm Dorian that hit the islands in September 2019.

A Washington Post report in late October 2019 also indicated that increasing temperatures have led to reduced ice cover over the years, leading to less protection from winter storms. "That ice has been disappearing ... [and the] sea-level rise, have caused the islands to crumble into the sea".

Researchers have found that the rise in sea levels has been approximately double that of the global norm and that the sea ice is shrinking at approximately 12% per decade. A November 2019 Washington Post report provided these specifics about the effects of erosion:"Some parts of the shoreline have lost as much as 14 feet per year to the sea over the past decade. Key roads face perpetual risk of washing out. The hospital and the city hall sit alarmingly close to deteriorating cliffs. Rising waters threaten to contaminate aquifers used for drinking water ... Nearly a dozen homes on the islands have been relocated, and most everyone expects that number to grow." The sole benefit has been the increase in lobster yields on the islands, at least double what was the norm in the past.

Economy

Tourism

Tourism is a major component of the islands' economy, as they have many kilometres of white sand beaches and steadily-eroding sandstone cliffs. Also, they are a destination for bicycle camping, sea kayaking, windsurfing, and kitesurfing. During the winter months, beginning in mid-February, ecotourists visit to observe newborn and young harp seal pups on the pack ice in the Gulf of St. Lawrence, which surrounds the islands. However the ice cover has reduced recently and the observation "season" has been cancelled several times.

Industry
The island is home to Canadian Salt Company Seleine Mines, which produces road salt for use in Quebec, Atlantic Canada and the United States' eastern seaboard. It produces  of salt, and employs 200 people.

Although fishing is a traditional occupation, lobster have become a more lucrative local business. It was once common for lobstermen to haul in  during a nine-week season that begins each spring, but now it is not unusual to bring home twice that amount, or more. This may be due to climate change that has warmed the surrounding waters to some extent, yielded increasing lobster harvests.

Transportation 

The Coopérative de transport maritime et aérien (Groupe C.T.M.A.) operates a ferry service between terminals in Souris, Prince Edward Island, and Cap-aux-Meules, on the islands. CTMA also operates a seasonal cruise ferry service between the islands and Montreal, which sits on a river island surrounded by mainland Quebec.

The Magdalen Islands Airport, at Havre-aux-Maisons, offers scheduled air service to the mainland of Quebec and, seasonally, to the French overseas collectivity of Saint-Pierre and Miquelon.

See also
 List of regional county municipalities and equivalent territories in Quebec
 Quebec Route 199, the only provincial highway on the islands
 Coopérative de transport maritime et aérien, the ferry company serving the Magdalen Islands
 Maritime Quebec
 List of Quebec regions
 Coins of the Magdalen Islands (numismatic history).
 List of islands of Quebec

References

External links 

 Municipalité des Îles-de-la-Madeleine
 Municipalités et villes de la Gaspésie
 Magdalen Islands tourist association
 The official tourist site of the islands
 Quebec tourism information on the Magdalen Islands including a map (with the French names)

 
Archipelagoes of Canada
Archipelagoes of the Atlantic Ocean
Canada geography articles needing translation from French Wikipedia
Coastal islands of Quebec
Landforms of Gaspésie–Îles-de-la-Madeleine
Territories equivalent to a regional county municipality
Census divisions of Quebec